I Gusti Made Astawa (born 3 May 1981 in Denpasar, Bali) is an Indonesian footballer that previously played for Arema FC in the Indonesia Super League.

References

1981 births
Association football defenders
Living people
Balinese people
Indonesian footballers
Liga 1 (Indonesia) players
Arema F.C. players
Deltras F.C. players
People from Denpasar
Sportspeople from Bali